Columbia Park is a  public park in Troutdale, Oregon, United States. The park houses a large playground called Imagination Station.

References

External links

 

Parks in Multnomah County, Oregon
Troutdale, Oregon